The 2020 Big East men's soccer tournament was the 8th edition of the Big East Conference Men's Soccer Tournament. The tournament decided the Big East Conference champion and guaranteed representative into the 2020 NCAA Division I men's soccer tournament.

Background 
The 2020 Big East Conference Men's Soccer Tournament was originally to be played in November 2020.  However, the Big East Conference postponed all fall sports with the hope to play them in the spring.

Format 
The top two teams in each division (east and midwest) qualified for the tournament.  The tournament was hosted by the number 1 overall seed, Georgetown.

Qualified teams

Bracket

Matches

Semifinals

Final

References 

Big East Conference Men's Soccer Tournament
Big East Conference Men's Soccer Tournament
2021 in sports in Washington, D.C.